Events from the year 1852 in Russia

Incumbents
 Monarch – Nicholas I

Events

 
 
  
  
 Central Telegraph
 Onega Canal
 Simon Janashia Museum of Georgia

Births

Deaths

References

1852 in Russia
Years of the 19th century in the Russian Empire